This is a list of Swedish composers, musical groups, musicians and singers:

Composers

A–M

 Johan Agrell (1701–1765), full name: Johan Joachim Agrell
 Hugo Alfvén (1872–1960), full name: Hugo Emil Alfvén
 Kurt Atterberg (1887–1974), full name: Kurt Magnus Atterberg
 Tor Aulin (1866–1914)
 Sven-Erik Bäck (1919–1994)
 Carl Michael Bellman (1740–1795)
 Berwald family
 Franz Adolf Berwald (1796–1868), composer, musician and businessman; and the best-known of the musical Berwalds
 Johan Fredrik Berwald (1787–1861), violinist, concert-master of the Swedish Royal Orchestra
 Julie Berwald, actress and singer at the Royal Swedish Opera, later married to baron Knut Åkerhielm
 Mathilda Berwald, née Cohn (married to Johan B.), singer to the Royal Court
 Ulf Björlin (1933–1993), conductor and composer
 Karl-Birger Blomdahl (1916–1968)
Britta Byström (born 1977), classical composer for orchestra
 Düben family, originally musicians, who were raised to the nobility through the favour especially of king Charles XII of Sweden. Family members other than those mentioned below were important in civil service or made important contributions to other fields.
 Gustaf Düben (1624–1690), organist of the German Church in Stockholm, Master of the Royal Swedish Court Orchestra, composer
 Lars Edlund (1922–2013)
 John Fernström (1897–1961), born in China of Swedish parents
 Gunnar de Frumerie (1908–1987)
 Harald Fryklöf (1882–1918)
 Ludwig Göransson, Acamedy-Award winning film score composer (born 1984)
 Thomas G:son (born 1968)
 Ebbe Grims-land (1915–2015)
 Jacob Adolf Hägg (1850–1928)
 Johann Christian Friedrich Hæffner (1759–1833), born in Germany
 Jan Johansson (1931–1968)
 Ulla Jones (born 1946)
 Edvin Kallstenius (1881–1967)
 Joseph Martin Kraus (1756–1792)
 Lars-Erik Larsson (1908–1986)
 Lykke Li (born 1986)
 Ingvar Lidholm (1921–2017)
 Adolf Fredrik Lindblad (1801–1878)
 Otto Lindblad (1809–1864)
 Bo Linde (1933–1970)
 Loreen (born 1983), Eurovision winner
 Ralph Lundsten (born 1936)
 Hildor Lundvik (1885–1951)
 Yngwie J. Malmsteen (born 1963), key figure in neoclassical metal, virtuoso guitarist, composer and multi-instrumentalist
 Rolf Martinsson (born 1956)
 Gertrud Maria Mell (1947–2016), organist, choir master and composer

N–Z

 Ludvig Norman (1831–1885), considered by some the outstanding Swedish composer between Franz Berwald and Wilhelm Stenhammar
 Gösta Nystroem (1890–1966)
 Wilhelm Peterson-Berger (1867–1942), full name: Olof Wilhelm Peterson-Berger
 Allan Pettersson (1911–1980), full name: Gustaf Allan Pettersson
 Ture Rangström (1884–1947)
 Johan Helmich Roman (1694–1758), called the "Swedish Handel"
 Hilding Rosenberg (1892–1985)
 Sven-David Sandström (1942-2019)
 Michael Saxell (born 1956)
 Fredrik Sixten (born 1962)
 Emil Sjögren (1853–1918), late romantic miniaturist
 August Söderman (1832–1876)
 Wilhelm Stenhammar (1871–1927)
 Hilda Thegerström (1838–1907), pianist and composer
 Gunnar Wennerberg (1817–1901), uncle of Sara Wennerberg-Reuter
 Sara Wennerberg-Reuter (1875–1959)
 Johan Wikmanson (1753–1800)
 Dag Wirén (1905–1986)
 Ferdinand Zellbell the Younger (1719—1780)

Conductors

 Ulf Björlin
 Herbert Blomstedt
 Sixten Ehrling
 Maria Eklund
 Eric Ericson
 Patrik Ringborg
 Niklas Willén

Musical groups

0–9
 59 Times The Pain

A–B

 ABBA
 Stikkan Anderson (manager)
 Benny Andersson
 Agnetha Fältskog
 Anni-Frid Lyngstad
 Michael Tretow (producer)
 Björn Ulvaeus
 Ace of Base
 Jenny Berggren
 Jonas Berggren
 Linn Berggren
 Ulf Ekberg
 Acid House Kings
 Alcazar
 Magnus Carlsson
 Lina Hedlund
 Andreas Lundstedt
 Tess Merkel
 Alice in Videoland
 ALPHA 60
 Amaranthe
 Amon Amarth
 Änglagård
 Antiloop
 Arcana
 Arch Enemy
 The Ark
 Ola Salo
 Armageddon

 Army of Lovers
 Alexander Bard
 Jean-Pierre Barda
 Michaela Dornonville de la Cour
 Camilla Henemark
 Dominika Peczynski
 Ashbury Heights
 Astral Doors
 At the Gates
 A-Teens
 Dhani Lennevald
 Sara Lumholdt
 Amit Sebastian Paul
 Marie Serneholt
Backyard Babies
Basic Element
Bathory
Bjärv
Blindside
Marcus Dahlström
Simon Grenehed
Christian Lindskog
Tomas Näslund
Blodsrit
Bloodbath
Blue Swede
Bo Kaspers Orkester
Bob Hund
Bodies Without Organs
Brainpool
Broder Daniel

C–D

Caesars
Candlemass
Caramba
Caramell
The Cardigans
Lars-Olof Johansson
Bengt Lagerberg
Nina Persson
Peter Svensson
Magnus Sveningsson
Carnal Forge
Charta 77
Ceremonial Oath
Clawfinger
Club 8
Clubland
Coca Carola
The Concretes
Corroded
Covenant
Crashdïet
Craft
The Crown
Crucified Barbara
Cult of Luna
Dark Funeral
Dark Tranquillity
Darkane
David & the Citizens
Dawn
De Lyckliga Kompisarna
Dead By April
Deathstars
Den Fule
Glenn Ljungström 
Hans Nilsson
Diablo Swing Orchestra
Diabolical Masquerade
Dimension Zero
Dismember
Dissection
Tomas Asklund
Jon Nödtveidt
Set Teitan
Division of Laura Lee
Doktor Kosmos
Dozer
Draconian
Dragonland
Dream Evil
Fredrik Nordström 
Drömhus
Dungen
Dynazty

E–G

Ebba Grön
Edge of Sanity
Ef
Eldkvarn
Elliphant
Engel
Entombed
Eskobar
Europe
Ian Haugland
John Levén
Kee Marcello
Mic Michaeli
John Norum
Tony Reno
Joey Tempest
Evergrey
The Fallen Empires
First Aid Kit
The Flower Kings
Freak Kitchen
Galantis
Gardenian
Garmarna
Gemini
Gert Jonnys
Ghost
Goat
Graveyard
Gravitonas
Alexander Bard
Günther and the Sunshine Girls
Gyllene Tider

H–K

H.E.A.T
HammerFall
Hardcore Superstar
The Haunted
Headplate
Anders Björler
Jonas Björler
Peter Dolving
Patrik Jensen
Per Möller Jensen
Hedningarna
Hållbus Totte Mattson
Anders Norudde
Magnus Stinnerbom
The Hellacopters
Nicke Andersson
Robert Dahlqvist
Kenny Håkansson
Matz Robert Eriksson
Anders "Boba Fett" Lindström
Hello Saferide
The Hep Stars
Benny Andersson
The Hives
Howlin' Pelle Almqvist
Nicholaus Arson
Chris Dangerous
Vigilante Carlstroem
Dr. Matt Destruction
Honey Is Cool
Hoola Bandoola Band
The Hootenanny Singers
Hoven Droven
Hypocrisy
iamamiwhoami
Jonna Lee 
Icona Pop
Caroline Hjelt
Aino Jawo
I'm from Barcelona
Emanuel Lundgren
Imminence
Imperiet
Joakim Thåström
In Flames
Anders Fridén
Björn Gelotte
Peter Iwers
Johan Larsson
Jesper Strömblad 
Daniel Svensson
The (International) Noise Conspiracy
J.E.M
Johnossi
Just D
Kaipa
Katatonia
Kent
Joakim Berg
Sami Sirviö
Khoma
Kill Squad vs. Doubleheader
Kite
The Knife
Komeda
Koop

L–O

Leather Nun
Freddie Wadling
The Legends
LeGrand
Lili & Susie
Lili Päivärinta
Susie Päivärinta
Little Dragon
LOK
Lord Belial
Love Is All
Lowe
Machinae Supremacy
Makthaverskan
Mando Diao
Marduk
The Mary Onettes
Mayhem's 1988–1991 singer Per Yngve Ohlin, also known as "Dead", also member of Swedish band Morbid
Melody Club
Meshuggah
Tomas Haake
Mårten Hagström
Jens Kidman
Dick Lövgren
Fredrik Thordendal
Miike Snow
Millencolin
Mathias Färm
Erik Ohlsson
Nikola Sarcevic
Fredrik Larzon
Moneybrother
Monster
Moonlight Agony
Movits!
Mustasch
Månegarm
Naglfar
Nasum
Nationalteatern
Ulf Dageby
Totta Näslund
NEXX
Nightingale
Nightrage
Ninedee
Nisses Nötter
No Fun at All
Nocturnal Rites
The Nomads
October Tide
Oh Laura
Onkel Kånkel
Opeth
Mikael Åkerfeldt
Martin Axenrot
Peter Lindgren
Martin Mendez
Per Wiberg
Orsa Spelmän

P–S

Pain
Pain of Salvation
Pan.Thy.Monium
Passenger
Peace Love & Pitbulls
Peter Bjorn and John
Play
Faye Hamlin
Anaïs Lameche
Janet Leon
Rosie Munter
Anna Sundstrand
The Poodles
Radio Dept.
Raised Fist
Razorlight
Rednex
Reeperbahn
Olle Ljungström
Refused
Ribspreader
Roxette
Marie Fredriksson
Per Gessle
Sabaton
Sahara Hotnights
Sambassadeur
Sandy Mouche
Christian Älvestam (former member)
Helena Josefsson
Jonas Kjellgren
Scar Symmetry
Secret Service
Shivering Spines
Shout Out Louds
Silent Border
Skwisgaar Skwigelf (lead guitarist of Dethklok)
Slagsmålsklubben
Soilwork
Björn Strid
Peter Wichers
Solution .45
Sonic Syndicate
The Sounds
Maja Ivarsson
The Soundtrack of Our Lives
The Spotnicks
Steel
Suburban Kids with Biblical Names
Sugarplum Fairy
Svartsyn
Swedish House Mafia
Steve Angello
Axwell
Sebastian Ingrosso

T–Z

Tad Morose
The Tages
Taken By Trees
Tallest Man on Earth
Teddybears sthlm
Joakim Åhlund
Klas Åhlund
Terror 2000
The Nuts
Therion
List of Therion members
Thermostatic
This Ending
This Perfect Day
Thomaz Ransmyr
Those Dancing Days
Thyrfing
Tiamat
The Tough Alliance
Triakel
Emma Härdelin
Truckfighters
Tråd
Unleashed
Vacuum
Alexander Bard (former member)
Mattias Lindblom
Marina Schiptjenko (former member)
Anders Wollbeck
Van
Vintersorg
Andreas "Vintersorg" Hedlund
Mattias Marklund
Violent Silence
The Wannadies
Whale
Whipped Cream
Zeigeist

Musicians

Mikael Åkerfeldt
Christian Älvestam
Christopher Amott
Daniel Antonsson
Martin Axenrot
Anders Björler
Jonas Björler
Nalle Colt
Peter Dolving
Niclas Engelin
Per Eriksson
Adrian Erlandsson
Daniel Erlandsson
Anders Fridén
Björn Gelotte
Martin Henriksson
Peter Iwers
Fredrik Johansson
Jonas Kjellgren
Anna Lang
Ingrid Lang-Fagerström
Johan Larsson 
Martin Larsson
Jonna Lee
Johan Liiva
Tomas Lindberg
Glenn Ljungström
Martin Lopez
Christofer Malmström
Kee Marcello
Lisa Miskovsky
Anders Nyström
Jonas Renkse
Speed 
Mikael Stanne
Jesper Strömblad
Niklas Sundin
Alf Svensson
Daniel Svensson
Dan Swanö
Peter Tägtgren
Peter Wichers
Peter Wildoer
Quorthon

Singers

Opera singers

List of Swedish operatic sopranos

Anna Bartels (1869–1950), soprano 
Davida Afzelius-Bohlin (1866–1955)), mezzo-soprano
Adèle Almati (1861–1919), mezzo-soprano
Ruth Althén (1980–1995), soprano
Vendela Andersson-Sörensen (1860–1926), soprano
Lovisa Augusti
Irma Björck (1898–1993), mezzo-soprano
Jussi Björling
Sophie Cysch (1847–1917), mezzo-soprano
Mathilda Ebeling (1826–1851), soprano
Mathilda Enequist
Malena Ernman
Wilhelmina Fundin (1819–1911), soprano
Nicolai Gedda
Maria Gelhaar (1858–1920), soprano
Wilhelmina Gelhaar (1837–1923), soprano
Håkan Hagegård
Josef Herou
Davida Hesse-Lilienberg (1877–1964), soprano
Thekla Hofer (1852–1938), soprano
Agnes Janson (1861–1947), mezzo-soprano
Liva Järnefelt  (1876–1971), mezzo-soprano
Anna Maria Klemming (1864–1889), soprano
Jan Kyhle
Karin Langebo (1927–2019), soprano
Anna Larsson
Jenny Lind
Paula Lizell (1873–1962), sooprano 
Magna Lykseth-Skogman (1874–1949), soprano
Kerstin Meyer (1928–2020), mezzo-soprano
Louise Michaëli
Birgit Nilsson
Christina Nilsson
Henriette Nissen-Saloman
Augusta Öhrström-Renard (1856–1921), mezzo-soprano
Elisabeth Olin
Signe Rappe-Welden (1879–1974), soprano
Margit Rosengren (1901–1952), soprano
Margareta Sjöstedt (1923–2012), contralto
Anne Sofie von Otter
Anna Sofia Sevelin
Elisabeth Söderström
Nina Stemme
Fredrika Stenhammar
Wilhelmina Strandberg (1845–1914), mezzo-soprano
Iréne Theorin
Astrid Varnay, 
Elisabeth Wärnfeldt
Lilly Walleni (1875–1920), mezzo-soprano
Zulamith Wellander (1857–1919), mezzo-soprano
Henriette Widerberg
Carolina Östberg

Popular music singers

A–M

Tommy Genesis, half Swedish
Salem Al Fakir
Felix Kjellberg (PewDiePie)
Joel Alme
Joel Berghult (RoomieOfficial)
Alice Babs
Basshunter
Robin Bengtsson
Linda Bengtzing
Lars Berghagen
Marit Bergman
Bertil Boo
Bosson
Joachim Cans
Pelle Carlberg
Agnes Carlsson
Eagle-Eye Cherry
Neneh Cherry
Shirley Clamp
Kikki Danielsson
Darin
Per Yngve Ohlin
Stefan Demert
Doris
Dr. Alban
Lotta Engberg
Martin "E-Type" Eriksson
Marie Fredriksson
Per Gessle
José González
Nanne Grönvall
Carola Häggkvist
Håkan Hellström
Kjell Höglund
Patrik Isaksson
Amanda Jenssen
Andreas Johnson
Ana Johnsson
Helena Josefsson
Tommy Körberg
Laleh
Zara Larsson
Tomas Ledin
Leila K.
Jens Lekman
Lykke Li
Lill Lindfors
Tove Lo
Ulf Lundell
Lars Lönndahl
Veronica Maggio
Amanda Mair
Siw Malmkvist
Meja
Andreas Moe

N–Z

SHY Martin
Sanna Nielsen
Stina Nordenstam
Tone Norum
Elena Paparizou
Charlotte Perrelli
Lena Philipsson
Povel Ramel
Bo Johan Renck
Robin Carlsson (Robyn)
Thomaz
Eric Saade
Danny Saucedo
Michael Saxell
September
Martin Stenmarck
Tove Styrke
Barbro "Lill-Babs" Svensson
Loreen Talhaoui
Joey Tempest
Thomaz
Titiyo
Viktoria Tolstoy
Magnus Uggla
Cornelis Vreeswijk
Yung Lean
Pernilla Wahlgren
Jenny Wilson
Lars Winnerbäck
Sophie Zelmani
Måns Zelmerlöw
Zikai
Maher Zain

Others

NOTD
Björn Afzelius
Airbase
Alesso
Marten Andersson
Avicii
Anna Bergström-Simonsson (1853–1937), voice teacher
John Dahlbäck
Mikkey Dee (drummer of Motörhead)
Arne Domnerus
Lisa Ekdahl
Jörgen Elofsson
Rolf Ericson
Bengt Forsberg 
Bo Hansson
Jakob Hellman
Jonny Jakobsen
Åsa Jinder
Jens Johansson
Peter Jöback
Nils Landgren
Christian Lindberg
Björn J:son Lindh
Yngwie J. Malmsteen 
Max Martin
Eddie Meduza
Totta Näslund
Lisa Nilsson
Myrra Malmberg
Stefan Olsdal
Åke Persson
Denniz Pop
Eric Prydz
Roland Pöntinen
Ilya Salmanzadeh
Björn Skifs
Stonebridge
Niklas Strömstedt
 Molly Sanden
Evert Taube
Joakim Thåström
Monica Törnell
Rebecka Törnqvist
Cecilia Vennersten
Monica Zetterlund

See also 

Popular music in Sweden
Lists of composers
Music of Sweden
Swedish hip hop
Royal Swedish Academy of Music

References

External links 

Music
Swedish music